Dębowiec or Dębówiec may refer to the following villages in Poland:
 Dębowiec, Konin County in Greater Poland Voivodeship (west-central Poland)
 Dębowiec, Krotoszyn County in Greater Poland Voivodeship (west-central Poland)
 Dębowiec, Międzychód County in Greater Poland Voivodeship (west-central Poland)
 Dębówiec, Gniezno County in Greater Poland Voivodeship (west-central Poland)
 Dębówiec, Konin County in Greater Poland Voivodeship (west-central Poland)
 Dębówiec, Krotoszyn County in Greater Poland Voivodeship (west-central Poland)
 Dębowiec, Lower Silesian Voivodeship (south-west Poland)
 Dębowiec, Bydgoszcz County in Kuyavian-Pomeranian Voivodeship (north-central Poland)
 Dębowiec, Sępólno County in Kuyavian-Pomeranian Voivodeship (north-central Poland)
 Dębowiec, Tuchola County in Kuyavian-Pomeranian Voivodeship (north-central Poland)
 Dębowiec, Łódź Voivodeship (central Poland)
 Dębowiec, Kraśnik County in Lublin Voivodeship (east Poland)
 Dębowiec, Włodawa County in Lublin Voivodeship (east Poland)
 Dębowiec, Zamość County in Lublin Voivodeship (east Poland)
 Dębowiec, Lubusz Voivodeship (west Poland)
 Dębowiec, Opole Voivodeship (south-west Poland)
 Dębowiec, Pomeranian Voivodeship (north Poland)
 Dębowiec, Częstochowa County in Silesian Voivodeship (south Poland)
 Dębowiec, Myszków County in Silesian Voivodeship (south Poland)
 Dębowiec, Cieszyn County in Silesian Voivodeship (south Poland)
 Dębowiec, Subcarpathian Voivodeship (south-east Poland)
 Dębowiec, Świętokrzyskie Voivodeship (south-central Poland)
 Dębowiec, Braniewo County in Warmian-Masurian Voivodeship (north Poland)
 Dębowiec, Działdowo County in Warmian-Masurian Voivodeship (north Poland)
 Dębowiec, Szczytno County in Warmian-Masurian Voivodeship (north Poland)